The Jemez Mountains salamander (Plethodon neomexicanus) is a species of salamander in the family Plethodontidae endemic to New Mexico in the United States. Its natural habitat is temperate forests. It is threatened by habitat loss,  is in rapid decline, and was placed on the IUCN Red List in 2013.

Endangered habitat

References

Amphibians of the United States
Plethodon
Amphibians described in 1950
Taxonomy articles created by Polbot
ESA endangered species